CNN Newsroom (formerly known as World Report, World One and Your World Today) is the main newscast program airing on CNN International, from Atlanta, London, and Hong Kong.  The show maintains two different roles: a daily morning show for EMEA and a weekend early breakfast show for Europe and Africa. It airs Mondays to Fridays in 3 parts, 6am to 8am, 8am to 10am and 10am to 11am CET, alongside various timeslots during weekends, which also includes a block from 8am to 12pm CET. It is also simulcast on CNN/U.S. (named on-air as Newsroom Live to avoid confusion with the locally based newscast) every Monday from 6am to 8am and on weekends from 8am to 10am GMT. The weekday edition's first hour (or second hour from March to November; named on-air in the Philippines as Newsroom International to avoid confusion with the locally based newscast) is simulcast Mondays to Fridays from 1pm to 2pm PST on CNN Philippines. In Hong Kong, it will be a 30-minute simulcast Mondays to Fridays from 1pm to 1:30pm HKT and Saturdays and Sundays from 12pm to 12:30pm and 5pm to 5:30pm HKT on ViuTVsix.

Previous incarnations
CNN International's main newscast brand for much of the 1990s was simply called "World News". In the late 1990s, the network introduced two editions of CNN This Morning. The first edition was broadcast from their studio in Hong Kong, and the second edition was broadcast from their production centre in London. Both editions were intended to be morning programmes for Asia and Europe, respectively.

After a revamp of CNN International in 2001, the programme was split into two and was renamed. The Asian programme was named NewsBiz Today, anchored by Kristie Lu Stout and Stan Grant in Hong Kong, while the European programme was named BizNews, and was anchored by Hala Gorani and Richard Quest in London.

CNN International underwent another revamp in 2004. In March of that year, NewsBiz Today and BizNews were both renamed to CNN Today.

CNN Today (2004–2009)
At its start, the Asian edition ran for three and a half hours (later reduced to just three hours) and the European edition ran for three hours. In both editions, the show had six segments between breaks every hour. At the top of the hour, both editions cover the top stories of the morning.

The second segment in the Asian edition takes a look at business headlines and introduces the first of 3 weather updates.  Its third and fourth segments looks more in-depth at some top stories.  The fifth segment continues with some technology and more business headlines, and sports and lighter stories as well as the business traveler's weather advisory are given before the hour ends.

The European edition has its first weather update before the 1st break and continues with major news reports on the 2nd segment.  Business stories are reported before the bottom of the hour.  At the bottom of the hour, world news headlines are recapped before going to more in-depth coverage of current issues.  A 2nd weather report is also presented at this time.  Like the Asian edition, sports stories and the business traveler's weather advisory are presented before the top of the hour.

In late 2004, the anchor lineups were changed. Monita Rajpal, who was based at CNN Center in Atlanta, moved to London to present the European edition with Richard Quest, while Hala Gorani subsequently moved to Atlanta. In early 2005, Quest stepped down as anchor to become a special correspondent, and Max Foster was hired to anchor the European edition with Rajpal.

As for the Asian edition, Stan Grant left CNN in 2012 to return to Australia. Hugh Riminton, another Australian, was hired to anchor the Asian edition with Kristie Lu Stout. During the Riminton-Lu Stout era, the programme won the Asian Television Award for Asia-Pacific's Best News Programme.

2008 refresh
CNN International began another revamp of the channel in late 2008. Starting in September, the Asian edition reverted to a single-anchor format. Kristie Lu Stout presented the first two hours, while Hugh Riminton anchored the last hour of the Asian edition and the first hour of the European edition. Also, the European edition was reduced by another 30 minutes for World Sport. The remaining 30 minutes aired after World Sport, and Max Foster anchored those last 30 minutes solo. As a result, Hong Kong produces four hours of CNN Today, while London produces a cumulative two hours of CNN Today.

The anchoring lineups changed once again. Lu Stout was on maternity leave for most of the end of 2008, and Kaushal Patel relieved for her. Kristie Lu Stout returned in January 2009, and Patel returned to Atlanta and later left the network. Anna Coren was hired from Seven Network in December 2008, and began presenting the third hour of the programme. On a related note, Hugh Riminton left CNN after four years with the channel and returned to Canberra, Australia to become the chief political correspondent for Network Ten. Kristie Lu Stout anchors the Asian evening bulletins, while Coren anchors mostly the Asian morning bulletins.

The newly shortened European edition also changed anchors. Monita Rajpal and Max Foster left the programme in April 2009. Don Riddell, a London-based sport anchor for CNN and Zain Verjee, then CNN State Department correspondent in Washington, became the anchors of the programme. Rajpal now anchors World Report later in the morning, while Foster is a special correspondent and relief anchor for Connect the World, an evening programme and other shows.

The European edition now features a new, lighter format for its first 90 continuous minutes. Sasha Herrimen presents a lighter story a few times throughout the programme and often provides a look at the front pages of London's newspapers.
The sport update is now shown on the show, and later the morning (Asia/European Time) World Business Today anchored by Charles Hodson and Andrew Stevens appears.

World Report (2009–2013)
On September 21, 2009, CNN Today, Your World Today and World News were rebranded as World Report; the network's long-running week-in-review programme, CNN World Report (which traditionally aired on Sunday afternoons on the American network) took a new name, World View, to make way for the new branding. Initially, there were multiple editions airing per day, at 0000, 0200, 0500, 0600, 0700, 0800, 0900, 1100, 1200, 1300 and 1700 (all times GMT). However, as CNN International's schedule evolved, these airtimes were reduced to weekend editions, and two separate three-hour morning blocks for Asian and European audiences. Anna Coren and Pauline Chiou anchored the Asian edition during these times.

The Asian morning edition of World Report was rebranded as CNN Newsroom in November 2012, to coincide with the revamp of CNN's Hong Kong studio, and the introduction of a new anchor team of Andrew Stevens and Patricia Wu.

Asian edition anchor Anna Coren received the 2011 Asian Television Award for "Best News Presenter or Anchor" for her work on the series.

CNN Newsroom (2013–present)
Effective June 17, 2013, World Report and World One were renamed CNN Newsroom. The new show was branded with new graphics, and originally used the previous World Report theme music, although this was changed quickly to the World One music. As of January 2020, CNN Newsroom is anchored by John Vause from 12:00 a.m. to 2:00 a.m. ET Tuesday-Friday and by Rosemary Church from 2:00 a.m. to 3:30 a.m. ET Monday-Thursday. It is anchored by Michael Holmes at 12:00 a.m. and 2:00 - 4:00 a.m ET on weekends and from 12:00 a.m. to 2:00 a.m. ET Mondays. Natalie Allen anchors from 2:00 a.m. to 3:30 a.m. ET Friday and 4:00 - 6:00 a.m. ET on weekends.  At 1:00 pm weekdays BST, Max Foster hosts a 30-minute edition of CNN Newsroom aimed as a prime-time show for Asia-Pacific, Kristie Lu Stout and Christina MacFarlane are relief anchors.

Due to the Coronavirus pandemic, CNN Newsroom has modified hours airing from 6:00-10:00 a.m. CET. The first two hours are anchored by John Vause or Michael Holmes and the last two are anchored by Rosemary Church or Kim Brunhuber with the 10:00 a.m. CET hour being anchored by either Isa Soares or Max Foster from London. Saturdays, the first block from 8:00-10:00 a.m. CET hour is anchored by Michael Holmes and the second block from 10:00 a.m - 12:00 p.m. CET anchored by Kim Brunhuber. Sundays there is one block of three hours from 09:00 a.m - 12:00 p.m. CET, anchored by Kim Brunhuber.

On Friday July 8, 2022, Japanese Prime Minister Shinzo Abe was shot twice in Nara, Japan while making a speech on behalf of an upcoming Liberal Prime Minister elect. CNN's coverage began on Don Lemon Tonight with Laura Coates who was filling in for Lemon. The coverage then continued on CNN Newsroom from the CNN Center in Atlanta with Lynda Kinkade, Michael Holmes, Kim Brunhuber and in London with Max Foster. Early Start followed CNN Newsroom with Max Foster. At 5:10 a.m EST, CNN reported that Shinzo Abe had died from the bullet wounds that hit his heart and had a team of 20 doctors who were working to save his life and had been assassinated. At 6:00 a.m EST, CNN International viewers broke away from regular programming and joined Max Foster again in London for a Special Edition of CNN Newsroom. The coverage ended at 2:00 p.m BST and then returned to regular programming with those regular programs covering the death of Shinzo Abe. Since the live coverage was on CNN World Sport didn't air on CNN International.

On September 8, 2022, CNN International began simulcasting CNN/US's Breaking News out of London as Queen Elizabeth II had died at the age of 96. Regular programming was paused. Between 12 a.m ET and the 5 a.m ET hour, CNN/U.S. viewers didn't receive replays on AC360 and Don Lemon Tonight replays as CNN Newsroom with Becky Anderson was airing to continue coverage of the Queen's death. Regular programming resumed after about 5 days with CNN Newsroom still airing on CNN US between 12 a.m ET and 5 a.m ET. On September 19 CNN aired the Funeral of Queen Elizabeth II which started at 5 a.m ET and then finished at 1 p.m ET, after which regular programming resumed.

CNN Today (2014–2019)

On November 3, 2014, instead of October 20, as first reported, the Asian morning block was rebranded to CNN Today anchored by Michael Holmes and Amara Walker at the network's headquarters in Atlanta. CNN Today was cancelled in 2019 and replaced with Your World Today with Isa Soares and Cyril Vanier.

Notable personalities 
Programs occasionally pre-empted for special programs.

Current anchors 

 John Vause (Atlanta)
 Michael Holmes (Atlanta)
 Rosemary Church (Atlanta)
 Kim Brunhuber (Atlanta)
 Max Foster (London)
 Bianca Nobilo (London)

Weather team 
 Derek Van Dam

Current fill-in anchors 
 Lynda Kinkade (Atlanta)
 Zain Asher (New York)
 Anna Coren (Hong Kong)
 Ivan Watson (Hong Kong)
 Christina Macfarlane (London)
 Kristie Lu Stout (Hong Kong)
 Will Ripley (Taipei)
 Nick Watt (Los Angeles)
 Paula Newton (Ottawa)

Former anchors 
 John Vause (Atlanta)
 Errol Barnett (Atlanta)
 Zain Asher (Atlanta)
 Natalie Allen (Atlanta)
 George Howell (Atlanta)
 Rosemary Church (Atlanta)

Former fill-in anchors 
 Patricia Chew
 Jim Clancy
 Hala Gorani
 Stan Grant
 Charles Hodson
 Richard Quest
 Monita Rajpal
 Anjali Rao
 Don Riddell
 Hugh Riminton
 Isha Sesay
 Ralitsa Vassileva
 Zain Verjee
 Pauline Chiou
 Patricia Wu
 Jonathan Mann
 Colleen McEdwards
 Fionnuala Sweeney

References

CNN original programming
Television articles with disputed naming style